Dolabrifera nicaraguana is a tropical species of sea hare found in the Eastern Pacific Ocean.

References 

 Keen, A. M. (1971). Sea Shells of Tropical West America. Marine mollusks from Baja California to Peru. ed. 2. Stanford University Press. xv, 1064 pp., 22 pls.

External links
 Manual of conchology, structural and systematic, with illustrations of the species. Ser. 1. Vol. 16: Philinidae, Gastropteridae, Aglajidae, Aplysiidae, Oxynoeidae, Runcinidae, Umbraculidae, Pleurobranchidae. pp vii, 1-262, pls 1-74. Philadelphia, published by the Conchological Section, Academy of Natural Sciences.
 Cunha, C. M.; Rosenberg, G. (2019). Type specimens of Aplysiida (Gastropoda, Heterobranchia) in the Academy of Natural Sciences of Philadelphia, with taxonomic remarks. Zoosystematics and Evolution. 95(2): 361-372.

Aplysiidae